Samuel Heinrich Schwabe (25 October 1789 – 11 April 1875) was a German astronomer remembered for his work on sunspots.

Schwabe was born in Dessau, Germany. At first an apothecary, he turned his attention to astronomy, and in 1826 commenced his observations on sunspots. Schwabe was looking for a theoretical planet inside the orbit of Mercury, known as Vulcan. Because of the proximity to the Sun, it would have been very difficult to observe such a planet, and Schwabe believed one possibility to detect a new planet might be to see it during its transit in front of the Sun. For 17 years, from 1826 to 1843, on every clear day, Schwabe would scan the Sun and record its spots trying to detect any new planet among them. He did not find any planet but noticed the regular variation in the number of sunspots and published his findings in a short article entitled "Solar Observations during 1843". In it he made the suggestion of a probable ten-year period (i.e. that at every tenth year the number of spots reached a maximum). This paper at first attracted little attention, but Rudolf Wolf who was at that time the director of Bern observatory, was impressed so he began regular observations of sunspots. Schwabe's observations were afterwards utilized in 1850 by Alexander von Humboldt in the third volume of his Kosmos. The periodicity of sunspots is now fully recognized; and to Schwabe is thus due the credit of one of the most important discoveries in astronomy.

In 1857 Schwabe was awarded the Gold Medal of the Royal Astronomical Society.

References

External links 
Excerpts from Solar Observations During 1843 by Heinrich Schwabe .
Address delivered by the President of the RAS on presenting the Gold Medal of the Society to M. Schwabe 
HAO "S. Heinrich Schwabe (1789-1875)" 
HAO "S. Heinrich Schwabe (1789-1875)"  with portrait.
Chris Plicht "Schwabe, Samuel Heinrich (1789 - 1875)"   
The Sun—History 

1789 births
1875 deaths
People from Dessau-Roßlau
19th-century German astronomers
Recipients of the Gold Medal of the Royal Astronomical Society
Foreign Members of the Royal Society